The 1996 Tour de Romandie was the 50th edition of the Tour de Romandie cycle race and was held from 6 May to 12 May 1996. The race started in Basel and finished in Geneva. The race was won by Abraham Olano of the Mapei team.

General classification

References

1996
Tour de Romandie